Cambrai is a town in France. It may also refer to:
Cambrai, South Australia, a small town in Australia
Archdiocese of Cambrai in northern France
Arrondissement of Cambrai, an arrondissement of France, located in the Nord department, in the Nord-Pas de Calais region. It has 7 cantons and 116 communes.
Cambrai, a commune in the Nord department in northern France. It is a sub-prefecture of the department.
Battle of Cambrai (1917), noted for the initially successful use of tanks in a large-scale combined arms operation, but ultimately ending in stalemate
Cambrai, 1917: The First Blitzkrieg, a 1974 wargame that simulates the 1917 battle
Battle of Cambrai (1918), in October 1918 was a British and Canadian victory
Cambrai a fictional country on the US soap opera Guiding Light

See also
Cambray, Ontario, a rural Canadian community
Cambray, New Mexico, a ghost town in Luna County, New Mexico
Fort Chambray, sometimes spelt Fort Chambrai or Cambray
William Cambray (1894–1978), British WWI flying ace